Colours Are Brighter is a charity record which was released on Rough Trade Records on 16 October 2006, all proceeds going to Save the Children. The CD features 13 songs aimed at children, by some of the UK's biggest indie pop bands, and was released with a set price of £9.99. Currently the album is not available to purchase on iTunes, but six songs are available on iTunes from separate albums. They are Skeleton Bang, David Wainwright’s Feet, The Monkeys Are Breaking Out The Zoo, Mud and The Big Ol Bug Is The New Baby Now. The rest are not available to download.

Track listing
 "Go Go Ninja Dinosaur" - Four Tet featuring Princess Watermelon
 "A Skeleton Bang" - Rasputina 
 "Jackie Jackson" - Franz Ferdinand  
 "I Am An Astronaut" - Snow Patrol
 "Three Cheers for Pooh, Cottleston Pie, Piglet Ho" - The Divine Comedy  
 "The King & I" - The Kooks
 "David Wainwright's Feet" - Half Man Half Biscuit 
 "Tidy Up Tidy Up" - The Barcelona Pavilion
 "Our Dog is Getting Older Now" - Jonathan Richman 
 "The Monkeys Are Breaking Out the Zoo" - Belle and Sebastian
 "Mud" - Ivor Cutler Trio 
 "The Big Ol' Bug Is the New Baby Now" - The Flaming Lips
 "Night Baking" - Kathryn Williams

References

External links
Colours Are Brighter on Myspace 
https://hearingvoices.com/2009/04/dog-getting-older/ The link to a music website that plays Our Dog Is Getting Older Now
https://www.google.co.uk/search?q=night+baking+kathyrn+willaims.&ie=UTF-8&oe=UTF-8&hl=en-ca&client=safari&safe=active The curious case of the lyrics to Night Baking replaced with music from The Kooks

2006 compilation albums
Charity albums